Nikolay Konstantinovich Dorizo (22 October 1923 – 31 January 2011) was a Russian poet.

Dorizo was born in Krasnodar.  His first poetry collection, On the native coasts, was published in 1948.

He was awarded the Order of the Badge of Honour and the Order of the Red Banner of Labour by the Soviet government. He died in Peredelkino.  After his death, Russian Prime Minister Vladimir Putin sent a message of condolence to Dorizo's family.

References

Soviet poets
Soviet male writers
20th-century Russian male writers
1923 births
2011 deaths
Communist Party of the Soviet Union members
Socialist realism writers
Russian lyricists
Soviet songwriters
Russian male poets